The following is a list of tracks that have hosted a Stadium Super Trucks race weekend.

True to the series name, the trucks originally raced mainly in American football stadiums on special dirt courses in emulation of the Mickey Thompson Entertainment Group stadium truck championship; four of the ten tracks that hosted a race during the inaugural season in 2013 were National Football League venues. From 2014 onward, the series began to shift toward road courses and street circuits as a support class for the IndyCar Series, a decision that founder Robby Gordon explained in 2017 helped bring the off-road-centric discipline to a "completely different fan audience." The track layout for these support races follow the IndyCar configuration but add aluminum ramps that enable the trucks to go airborne. SST has also supported other championships and events such as NASCAR and the Race of Champions. The Boost Mobile Super Trucks, SST's standalone Australian series, mainly supports the Supercars Championship. SST began racing in Oceania in 2015. Much of the trucks' Australian competition has come under Motorsport Australia sanction, though the series has also supported the Australian Auto Sport Alliance and Ultimate Sprintcar Championship.

Despite shifting to being the undercard for major racing disciplines, the series has continued to host standalone events on occasion such as the Race & Rock World Championship at Lake Elsinore Diamond and the Robby Gordon Off-Road World Championships at Glen Helen Regional Park. Although SST has also participated at events such as the Goodwood Festival of Speed and Race of Champions in 2014 and conducted special races such as the 2016 Mike's Peak Hill Climb Challenge in Baja California, those host sites are not listed below as they are not considered official SST races.

Key

Figures listed below are correct as of the most recent Stadium Super Trucks race weekend at Bristol Motor Speedway (September 3–4, 2022).

"Rounds Held" refers to the total number of race weekends hosted by a track, while "Races Held" means the amount of races held. A round can consist of multiple races. Heat races are not included.

2022 tracks

Former tracks

Notes

References

Stadium Super Trucks tracks